Jonathan Cohen is a British pianist, composer and musical director.

He is known for his work on many BBC children's programmes from the 1960s to the 1990s, including Play School, Playbus (latterly Playdays), Play Away, Rentaghost and Jackanory. He appeared as a pianist on programmes such as Play Away and also presented some of the musical items.

In the latter part of his career, he became heavily involved with programmes for BBC Schools co-presenting Music Time with Helen Speirs. This was a popular, long-running series aimed at primary school children that focused on teaching singing and instrumentation. First broadcast in 1970, it was presented by Cohen from 1983 until the final series in 1991. He also had prominent roles on several other BBC Schools series aimed at older Junior children, notably the award-winning series The Music Arcade (1979-1986), and Into Music.

In 2005, he staged a theatre production called Still Playing Away alongside former Play Away presenter Brian Cant, which was a trip down memory lane of the 1960s, 1970s, and 1980s.

He leads the annual Christmas Carol Singalong at the Royal Festival Hall, London Birmingham Symphony Hall and Bridgewater Hall, Manchester, using his own arrangements of traditional Christmas songs and carols.

Selected discography
 1973 - Play Away. BBC Records (RBT 19)
 1975 - "}Hey You!" - Songs from The BBC TV Series "Play Away". BBC Records and Tapes (REC 209)
 1981 - Hello! - Songs from BBC TV's "Play School" and "Play Away". BBC Records (REC 425)
 1984 - Singing In The Band - Songs from BBC TV's "Play School" and "Play Away". BBC Records (REC 495)
 1986 - Elisabeth Welch in Concert. First Night Records (OCR CD6016)

Music for television
 Jackanory
 Rentaghost
 Galloping Galaxies!
 Playdays
 Greenclaws
 Uncle Jack
 Come Outside
 Living Within The Seasons (Alongside Peter Hodges)
 Step Inside
 Melvin and Maureen's Music-a-grams
 Monster Café (series 2)
 Julia Jekyll and Harriet Hyde

References

External links

"Brian goes back to playschool", Bucks Free Press, 9 November 2005 (viewed 12 July 2009)
, BBC - The Look of Love

British television presenters
British male pianists
British composers
21st-century pianists
Living people
Year of birth missing (living people)
21st-century British male musicians